Slow Club were an English duo formed in Sheffield in 2006. The band consisted of multi-instrumentalists Charles Watson and Rebecca Lucy Taylor, with Watson contributing piano, Taylor contributing drums, and both performing guitar and vocals. The band split in 2017 following an extensive tour to support their last album, with both members moving on to solo projects.

History
Slow Club formed in 2006 following the dissolution of the indie-rock band The Lonely Hearts

The band released two 7" singles in 2007, "Because We're Dead" and "Me and You", on Moshi Moshi Records. On 1 September 2008, their first extended play, Let's Fall Back in Love, was released. A Christmas single, titled "Christmas TV", was released in December 2008.

Their debut album, Yeah So, was recorded by Mike Timm at Axis Studio in Sheffield and released in July 2009, followed by the release of their second EP Christmas, Thanks For Nothing in December 2009.

The band's second album, Paradise, produced by Luke Smith (Clor), was released on 12 September 2011. In 2012 "Beginners", the final single from the album, was released. The video features actor (and Slow Club fan) Daniel Radcliffe.

Slow Club have toured extensively around UK, Europe, US, Australia and Japan and played major UK festivals, including Glastonbury festival, Latitude festival and Green Man Festival. They have supported acts such as KT Tunstall, Florence and the Machine and Mumford and Sons. They often collaborated with other musicians, such as Sweet Baboo, during live shows.

In spring 2013 the band went back into the studio with Colin Elliot (who has worked with Richard Hawley) and started recording their third album. The album Complete Surrender was released on 14 July 2014. The band's touring line-up included long-time drummer Avvon Chambers and bassist Rob Jones. They were also occasionally joined by Fyfe Dangerfield.

The band released their fourth album One Day All of This Won't Matter Anymore, recorded in Richmond, Virginia, in 2016.

Following a tour in late 2016 - early 2017, the duo split up, with both working on solo projects. Taylor later discussed feeling unfulfilled by the joint project before the split. The tour was documented in the film Our Most Brilliant Friends directed by Piers Dennis.

Charles Watson released his solo debut album, Now That I'm A River, in May 2018. Rebecca Lucy Taylor's debut, Compliments Please, was released in March 2019, under the name Self Esteem.

Critical reception
Slow Club were generally well received by critics. Metro described the band and its music, "Charming two-part harmonies, scruffy pop melodies and bitingly aware lyrics mark out this endearing two-piece." Robin Murray for Clash wrote "Charles Watson and Rebecca Lucy Taylor built up a truly unique catalogue, four albums of joyous, heart-rending, and frequently under-rated songwriting".

Discography

Albums

EPs

Singles

References

External links

English folk rock groups
Musical groups established in 2006
Musical groups disestablished in 2017
English indie rock groups
Musical groups from Sheffield
English musical duos
Caroline Records artists
Wichita Recordings artists
Moshi Moshi Records artists
Male–female musical duos